The 2009 flu outbreak in Malaysia was part of a larger flu pandemic involving a new type of influenza A virus subtype H1N1 (A (H1N1)) virus. As of 11 August 2009, the country had over 2,253 cases, beginning with imported cases from affected countries, including the United States and Australia from 15 May 2009 onwards, and the first identified local transmission on 17 June 2009. From 12 August, the Malaysian Health Ministry said that it had discontinue officially updating the total number of H1N1 cases within Malaysia in line with guidelines issued by the World Health Organization. As of 21 August 2009 the unofficial number of cases reported in the media is 5,876 so far.  The first death related to the A(H1N1) virus was reported on 23 July 2009 and so far there have been 78 deaths reported. On 6 July 2009 Malaysia announced that it was shifting from containment to mitigation to tackle the spread of the virus. The federal government had declared a national health emergency in Malaysia because of the A(H1N1) outbreak and was considering imposing a health curfew similar to the week-long shutdown of non-essential services and industries in Mexico.

Government measures 

Since the Nipah virus outbreak in 1999, the Malaysian Health Ministry have put in place processes to be better prepared to protect the Malaysian population from the threat of infectious diseases. Malaysia was fully prepared during the Severe Acute Respiratory Syndrome (SARS) situation (Malaysia was not a SARS affected country) and the episode of the H5N1 (bird flu) outbreak in 2004

The Malaysian government has developed a National Influenza Pandemic Preparedness Plan (NIPPP) which serves as a time bound guide for preparedness and response plan for influenza pandemic. It provides a policy and strategic framework for a multisectoral response and contains specific advice and actions to be undertaken by the Ministry of Health at the different levels, other governmental departments and agencies and non-governmental organisations to ensure that resources are mobilised and used most efficiently before, during and after a pandemic episode.

According to the Malaysian Ministry of Health, headed by Liow Tiong Lai, health screenings were carried out on passengers travelling to and from Mexico via sea, air and land beginning 17 April 2009. The Health Ministry's disease control division has activated its operations room to monitor the swine flu situation and informed medical practitioners who are treating cases with symptoms of influenza-like illness or severe pneumonia and persons who had visited Mexico, California or Texas to inform the district health office immediately for preventive and control measures. As has several Asian countries, thermal scanners had been installed at entry points at the Kuala Lumpur International Airport (KLIA) following the start of the global alert on the flu. Screenings were imposed in Pengkalan Hulu, at the border with Thailand, in late April. Quarantine rooms had been allocated in 28 hospitals, and the country has stockpiled more than 2 million doses of Tamiflu, as of May 2009.

The Malaysian Health Ministry has warned Malaysians not to withhold health information to the authorities saying that those doing so could be fined RM10,000 or jailed two years or both if they are found guilty under the Disease Prevention Act 1988. On 18 June 2009 Malaysian Deputy Prime Minister Tan Sri Muhyiddin Yassin declared that all visitors and Malaysians returning from abroad will be required to fill the health declaration form following the influenza A (H1N1) pandemic around the world.

Mitigation of the Virus 
On 17 August, The Government said that will consider declaring a health curfew if the mortality rate of Influenza A(H1N1) is above 0.4% from the current 0.1%-0.3%. Health Minister Datuk Seri Liow Tiong Lai said that they are currently treating the flu as a "health emergency".

Mask use 

Health Minister Datuk Seri Liow Tiong Lai urged the public to wear a mask if showing symptoms of the flu.

School closures 
In response to the country's first case of A (H1N1), the health ministry urged calm among the populace "as the situation is under control" and "the ministry has taken all the possible precautionary measures to control and contain the disease after the WHO issued a level-five alert." In addition, schools were issued strict hygiene procedures on 16 May to contain any H1N1 outbreak among students and teachers.

Sekolah Rendah Kebangsaan Assunta 1 in Petaling Jaya became the fourth school to be closed in a week.

A (H1N1) cases 
The country had reported no suspected cases before 4 May 2009, but all cases tested negative between 4 and 15 May.
The 2009 FOBISSEA primary tournament in Kuala Lumpur was cancelled due to an unidentified student who was found to have contracted the virus whilst at the airport. Teams from British International Schools throughout South-East Asia were immediately sent home and quarantined.

15 May – 10 June 
On 15 May, the Health Ministry confirmed Malaysia's first case of A (H1N1) infection of a 21-year-old male student who had arrived at the KLIA on 13 May via a Malaysia Airlines flight (MH091) from Newark and on transit at Stockholm-Arlanda Airport, followed by a second case on 16 May of a female student in Penang who shared the same flight as the first patient and boarded an AirAsia flight (AK5358) from KLIA to Penang International Airport. This makes Malaysia the 36th country to detect A (H1N1) within its borders.

The first patient has been hospitalised at the Sungai Buloh Hospital, while house quarantines were undertaken on two of the second patient's friends who boarded the same flight, along with their family members. All passengers of the flights were also asked to contact the Health Ministry or head to any hospital, clinic or health office or further action, and crew members of MH091 and AK5358 were located and grounded. As the first patient has indicated, the use of thermal scanners is revealed not to be entirely effective as symptoms of his flu had yet to manifest; the Health Ministry resumes the use of the scanners nevertheless.

On 4 June, three additional inbound airline passengers were reported to be carrying the virus. The earliest of the three is a 23-year-old male student who returned from United States on 1 June via the same Malaysian Airlines flight (MH091) that the first cases of A (H1N1) were detected. On the same day, two German tourists and friends (aged 30 and 32) who were holidaying in Southeast Asia and arrived in Malaysia were confirmed to be infected with the virus; both had flown into the country on 3 June via an Air Asia flight (AK702) after transferring from a Singapore Airlines flight (SQ45) from Germany to Singapore on 1 June. The third reported victim developed symptoms on 3 June and was hospitalised in Tunku Jaafar Hospital, while the two tourists developed symptoms while in Kuala Lumpur on 3 June and were given similar medical treatment. All three patients were reported to be stable. As it has been for the last two cases, passengers sharing both the Malaysian Airlines and Air Asia flights are being traced. On 5 June, sixth case were reported from a student who took the same flight with the fourth patient. On the next day, a girl from Australia was confirmed to be infected with Influenza A (H1N1) when the airport scanner detected severe fever making her the 7th confirmed case overall in Malaysia.

10–20 June 
On 10 June, two new Influenza A(H1N1) cases had been detected in Malaysia. The eighth case involved a 17-year-old American student who accompanied her parents for a holiday in the country. The ninth case was a New Zealand national who arrived in the country at 7.30am on 5 June on an Air Asia flight DX7 2723. Malaysia recently registered two more cases of the disease, bringing the total to 11 cases. The 10th patient in the country was a 17-year-old girl who had just returned from a holiday in Melbourne, Australia on 9 June. The 11th patient was a 41-year-old woman who had returned from Manila to Penang on 6 June.

A 12th case was reported on 13 June 2009 whereby a 19-year-old medical student was returning to Malaysia after a 17-day holiday in Melbourne.

As of 15 June 2009, the total number of cases have increased to 17, with an addition of 5 new cases. The 13th case was a 12-year-old student who returned from a holiday in Manila. The 14th case was a British tourist, hospitalised in Kuantan after showing symptoms in Pulau Tioman. The 15th and 17th cases involved Malaysians who recently came back from Melbourne, both being currently hospitalised in Sungai Buloh Hospital. The 16th case involved an American resident, currently hospitalised in Queen Elizabeth Hospital in Kota Kinabalu, Sabah. A Filipino man was confirmed as the 18th victim of influenza A (H1N1) in Malaysia, after being detected as having a fever and cough during the screening process when he arrived at the KL International Airport from Manila.

Malaysia recorded its first local infection of influenza A(H1N1) on 17 June 2009 involving the 19th case as that person had no history of having travelled to a country that had the flu.

A 20th case was reported whereby a 23-year-old local public university male student who made a seven-day study visit together with 12 students and lecturers to Melbourne, returned from Melbourne aboard Air Asia X D7 2723 and landed at the Low Cost Carrier Terminal on 17 June. The 21st case came about with a 20-year-old medical student of a Melbourne university who returned to holiday in Malaysia aboard MH 128 and arrived at the KLIA on 16 June. The 22nd case showed that a 54-year-old man who had travelled to Manila on business on 9 June and arrived at KLIA on 12 June.  It was reported that the 23rd case was a 22-year-old female Malaysian student who arrived from Melbourne by Air Asia at the LCCT on 14 June.

On 18 June 2009 the Crisis Preparedness and Response Centre in Malaysia reported there were four imported cases of Influenza A(H1N1), bringing to total of 27 cases overall.

On 19 June 2009 Director-General of Health Tan Sri Dr Mohd Ismail Merican said that eight new Influenza A(H1N1) cases were detected bringing the total number of cases of the disease in Malaysia to 35. The 35th case is a 20-year-old male Malaysian student who is studying in a university in Melbourne and has been there since January who came back to Malaysia for a holiday.

20–30 June 
On 20 June 2009 7 new cases of A(H1N1) were reported bringing the total number of confirmed cases so far to 42.  One of the new cases included a local transmission of the virus whereby an 11-year-old student of Sekolah Jenis Kebangsaan Cina (SJKC) Davidson, Kuala Lumpur, contracted the virus from her grandmother who was 31st case confirmed.

On 21 June 2009, eight more cases confirmed. Three of them were students from SJK(C) Jalan Davidson who contracted the virus from the 31st patient, which brought the total of confirmed cases in the country soaring to 50. SJK(C) Jalan Davidson had also been closed and more than one thousand people in the school had been quarantined.

On 22 June 2009 it was reported that there were 8 new cases of A(H1N1) in Malaysia bringing the total number of confirmed cases to 58 overall.  The 51st case is a three-year-old girl who returned from a week-long holiday in Melbourne on 19 June with her parents on MH 148. The 52nd case is a 35-year-old MAS air steward who was on duty on MH1 Delta from London and arrived in KLIA on 18 June. The 53rd case is a 27-year-old woman who returned from a holiday in Sydney with her husband on 16 June on MH 122. She is in Kuala Lumpur Hospital. The 54th case is a 25-year-old woman who had contact with the 48th case and was confirmed with the flu 21 June in Hospital Sultanah Bahiyah, Alor Star. She is the 5th local transmission.

1–10 July 
On 9 July 61 new cases of Influenza A(H1N1) were confirmed, consisting of 37 imported cases and 24 locally transmitted which makes the number of cases in Malaysia soared to 574. Among the 574 cases, 415 cases were reported to have been imported while 159 cases were locally transmitted. One of the visitors who visited a company in Cyberjaya were confirmed to have contracted the virus, which caused 12 workers to be put under home quarantine.

11–31 July 
On  23, 18 July new cases were confirmed in Malaysia consisting 17 local transmission and 1 imported case.

1 August onwards 
According to the Health Ministry another 39 cases of A(H1N1) were reported on 2 August.

16 new cases of H1N1 were discovered on 5 August 2009 bringing the total number of cases to 1,492.

33 new cases were reported on 6 August 2009, bringing the total cases in Malaysia to 1525. It was reported on the same day that an immigration detainee from Togo was found dead at the Sepang detention centre. According to the guard, the prisoner did not complain of fever or cough. Autopsy were conducted on 4 August 2009 in Selayang Hospital and discovered that the patient had Influenza A(H1N1). However, they were still unable to determine if the flu was the direct cause of the patient's fatality.

On 8 August 2009, 53 more cases were confirmed and brought the number of cases in Malaysia to 1578. Among the 1578 cases, 574(36%) were imported cases and 1004(64%) were local transmission.

A record of more than 200 cases were confirmed on 9 August 2009. 202 new local transmitted cases were confirmed which brought the number of flu cases soared to 1780. 13 patients were still in ICU, and four of them were still in critical condition. 270 new local cases were confirmed on 11 August 2009, bringing the total cases in Malaysia to 2,253.

Deaths

July 
On 23 July 2009 first A(H1N1) related death was confirmed. The patient is a 30-year-old Indonesian man who had multiple medical condition, including obesity and enlarged heart. However, Health Minister Datuk Liow Tiong Lai revealed that the flu was not the direct cause of the patient's fatality.

August 
On 6 August 2009, in Putrajaya another death was confirmed involving a 57-year-old pensioner who was a diabetic and had hypertension. On 7 August 2009, a 40-year-old obese man who was admitted to Kuala Lumpur Hospital died of acute coronary syndrome and cardiogenic shock. The man had developed a fever and had been coughing since 28 July 2009. His autopsy result confirmed that he is the nation's fifteen Influenza A(H1N1) death.

On 8 August 2009, three more deaths were recorded, which brought the death cases in Malaysia to 18. The sixteenth death was a 5-year-old boy who had upper respiratory tract infection and sought treatment in a private clinic on 3 August. He was then had a seizure and was sent to Tengku Ampuan Afzan Hospital and confirmed to have the H1N1 virus. He died on 7 August 2009 due to acute encephalitis secondary to Influenza A(H1N1). The seventeenth death was a one-year-old toddler who had history of hyperthyroidism and was under treatment for it. He had symptoms of the flu but did not seek for treatment. He was then sent to Sultanah Amanah Hospital, Johor Bahru. He was confirmed to have the flu on 4 August 2009. However, after five days of treatment, his condition deteriorated with symptoms of drowsiness, lethargy and altered consciousness and was sent to ICU. On 7 August 2009, he died due to pneumonia with underlying H1N1 infection. The eighteenth death was a 63-year-old man who had asthma and tuberculosis. He was admitted to Selayang Hospital and died on 6 August due to severe pneumonia with positive Influenza A(H1N1) and underlying pulmonary tuberculosis.

Eight more deaths were confirmed on 9 August 2009. Among the eight patient who died, three died on 3 August, two on 5 August, four on 7 August and one on 8 August. All of them were in the high-risk group except a 20-year-old college student who was found dead at her hostel about a week after obtaining outpatient treatment. Among the dead were two Sabahans, one of them was a 24-year-old obese woman from Ranau who died of pulmonary oedema after a bout of flu while the other one was a 74-year-old man who had a history of heart problem who died of pneumonia and pulmonary oedema. The other deaths were a 47-year-old patient with asthma in Sarawak and a 37-year-old obese man who died of broncho-pneumonia at the hospital in Johor Bahru.

Six more deaths were confirmed on 10 August 2009, bringing the total death cases in Malaysia skyrocketed to 32. Of the six cases, four of them had underlying medical cases.
Another six deaths were recorded on 11 August 2009. Among the six death cases, four of them had been diagnosed with asthma, hypertension and diabetes.

As at 12 August 2009 the total of deaths reported raised to 44 with six more cases confirmed. A 60-year-old man who had histories of diabetes, hypertension and heart problems was hospitalised on 6 August after showing symptoms of the flu. Throat swab and antiviral drugs were prescribed. However, he died on the next day due to severe pneumonia. Lab result confirmed the man as an Influenza A(H1N1) patient on 9 August. A 62-year-old man who was a diabetic was hospitalised on 6 August. He was then later dehydrated and given antiviral drug for precaution against the flu. Throat swab was taken on 7 August. However, he died on the same day due to pneumonia and possible cancer. A 20-year-old who didn't have any history of underlying medical condition experienced fever, coughing and sore throat. He sought for treatment at a hospital on 6 August and was later hospitalised due to suffocation. Antiviral drugs were later prescribed by the doctor. On the next day, he died due to severe pneumonia and septicaemia. A 10-year-old baby was among the death cases confirmed on 12 August. She showed symptoms but was hospitalised six days later due to suffocation. Antiviral drugs were not given. On the next day, she died due to bronchopneumonia. An 18-year-old woman who was 26 weeks pregnant, and was also obese, showed symptoms on 3 August. Her condition deteriorated and was then later sent to ICU, where a throat swab was performed. She died due to severe pneumonia. A 1-year-old toddler who had congenital heart disease had a seizure and fever on 7 August. Antiviral drugs were not given to the toddler and he died on 9 August 2009 while undergoing a surgery.

Seven more deaths were confirmed on 13 August 2009, bringing the total number of death cases in Malaysia rose to 51. All of the seven fatalities were in high-risk group.
A 4-month-old baby who had an extremely low immunity was hospitalised on 8 August 2009 after he showed symptoms of fever, breathing difficulty, vomiting, coughing and diarrhoea. A throat swab was conducted, but he died on 10 August due to severe pneumonia. Lab result confirmed he had Influenza A(H1N1) on the next day, making him one of the victims of the flu. A 37-year-old diabetic woman was hospitalised after showing symptoms. She was later given antiviral drugs but died on 10 August. A 69-year-old woman who had history of hypertension was found to have been coughing. Throat swab was conducted after she was transferred to ICU due to suffocation. On 11 August 2009, she died due to acute myocarditis. A woman in her 20s, who also had a history of congenital disease, started to have fever and coughing on 6 August. She was later admitted and given antiviral drugs on 8 August. However, she died on 10 August due to severe bronchopneumonia. A 4-year-old boy who had congenital disease was treated on 2 August after exhibiting symptoms of the flu. He was later confirmed to have the flu after a throat swab was taken; however, he died before the confirmation was received. A 92-year-old lady who had asthma and a 43-year-old man who had diabetes, hypertension and heart diseases died on 11 August 2009 due to severe pneumonia.

Five more cases were confirmed on 14 August. A two-month-old baby who was born prematurely was admitted to the hospital following fever, coughing, sneezing and difficulty in breathing. He was given antiviral drugs and was placed on mechanical ventilation as his condition deteriorated, but he died on 12 August due to pneumonia. Another two-month-old baby was rushed to the hospital when he was found unconscious. His condition was critical and was sent to ICU. He tested positive for the flu on 8 August, but died on 10 August due to myocarditis, hepatitis and renal impairment associated with H1N1. A 49-year-old diabetic woman, who was also obese and having tuberculosis was confirmed to have the virus on 11 August. A 57-year-old diabetic man sought for treatment on 2 August after showing symptoms of the flu. On 3 August, he returned to the clinic after experiencing fever, vomiting and diarrhoea. He was then sent to hospital and given antiviral drugs. Despite given antiviral drugs, he died on 12 August due to sepsis. A 19-year-old teenager was admitted to the hospital after complaining having fever and coughing. He was then suffocated and died on 11 August due to pneumonia.

3 more deaths were confirmed on 15 August. A 22-year-old obese man was hospitalised on 9 August but died on 12 August due to viral pneumonia. A 29-year-old man who had valvular heart disease was admitted to the hospital after flu symptoms persisted for 2 days. Antiviral drugs were given on 10 August but he died 2 days later due to bronchopneumonia. A 44-year-old woman who had asthma was tested positive for the flu on 10 August but died on 13 August due to pneumonia.

Another three deaths were confirmed on 16 August, raising the total number of deaths to 62. The 59th death was a 6-year-old child with Down's syndrome who had the flu for 3 days before being confirmed as a H1N1 patient. He died on 13 August due to pneumonia with underlying Down's syndrome with AVSD and pulmonary hypertension. A 3-year-old child was hospitalised on 1 August after having symptoms for 5 days. Confirmed to have contracted the virus on 3 August and antiviral drugs were given on the same day. However, he died on 14 August due to severe pneumonia. A man in his 50s who had symptoms on 28 July was hospitalised. He also had been vomiting and had had diarrhoea two days before he was admitted. On 13 August, he was confirmed dead due to septicaemia with severe pneumonia.

On 17 August, two more deaths were announced. A 7-month-old boy who had asthma was transferred to ICU after having fever and coughing for 2 days. Antiviral drugs were given and was confirmed to have the virus on 12 August. However, he was confirmed dead three days later due to severe pneumonia and acute respiratory failure. A 74-year-old diabetic woman, who also had CCF was admitted to the hospital after she was found unconscious in her house. She died on 11 August due to severe pneumonia. Her test results came back on 12 August and confirmed her as a H1N1 patient.

On 18 August, three more death cases were confirmed and brought the number of death cases in Malaysia to 67. A 33-year-old woman was transferred to ICU after her lungs disease began to deteriorate after 4 days of treatment in a private hospital. She showed symptoms on 31 July and antiviral drugs were started on 7 August. On 12 August, she died due to bronchopneumonia. Her result later came back and was positive for the flu. A 10-year-old school girl, who was diagnosed with Systemic lupus erythematosus was sent to ICU after she had breathing difficulty, chest pain and stomach ache. Antiviral drugs were given since 8 July. Despite on medicine, she died on 13 August due to Systemic lupus erythematous with severe pneumonia with renal impairment. A 71-year-old woman with Chronic obstructive pulmonary disease, hypertension, Ischaemic heart disease and Diabetes mellitus type 2, showed symptoms of the flu and was hospitalised on 12 August. However, on 14 August, she died due to Ischaemic dilated cardiomyopathy precipitated by pneumonia.

On 20 August, one new death was confirmed. The victim was a 34-year-old woman who was in the 34th week of pregnancy. The patient was treated and admitted into a private hospital in Johor Baru on 8 Aug after developing fever and cough for a day. She was subsequently, referred and admitted to the intensive care unit of the Sultanah Aminah Hospital in Johor Baru for breathing difficulties five days later. Tamiflu was administered. However, she died on next day due to severe pneumonia and respiratory failure.

Another death was confirmed on 24 August, increasing the death toll to 69. The patient, a 38-year-old teacher, who was also obese, tested positive for H1N1 by a private clinic. Tamiflu was not administered but only gave her symptomatic treatment. Five days later, on 18 August, she was admitted to the hospital after having breathing difficulties and cyanosis. She was referred to KL Hospital and Tamiflu was administered. However, the woman died on 19 August due to pneumonia with AVDS. One more death was confirmed on 25 August by the Mortality Review Committee. A 3-year-old boy who had febrile convulsion and cough was hospitalised on 12 August. The boy was then transferred to ICU after his condition deteriorate and tamiflu was administered. He tested positive for the flu on 17 August. However, he died on the next day due to H1N1 encephalitis with Cerebral oedema and multiorgan failure.

The death of a 24-year-old woman brought the number of cases in Malaysia to 71. The patient, having fever, cough and headache was admitted to a private hospital in Kuantan on 10 August and received viral pneumonitis treatment. She was then referred to a government hospital and placed in ICU after her condition worsened. Her condition continued to deteriorate despite the administration of Tamiflu. On 19 August, she was confirmed dead due to H1N1 secondary to ARDS.

One more death was confirmed on 30 August. A 49-year-old patient with heart problems was brought to Melaka Hospital after having fever, cough and vomiting which persisted for 2 days. He was given antiviral drugs and antibiotics and he was also tested for tuberculosis, typhoid, dengue, Leptospirosis and H1N1 but all of the tests came back negative. The patient's condition deteriorate and was confirmed dead on 19 August due to severe pneumonia with septic shock and H1N1. The post-mortem biopsy report based on lung samples tested positive for Influenza A(H1N1) on 24 Aug.

September 
On 3 September 2009 the death of a 25-year-old woman was confirmed bringing the total number of deaths related to A(H1N1) to 73. The woman received outpatient treatment after developing flu symptoms. She was then subsequently brought to Sibu Hospital and administered antiviral drugs. However, she died on 1 September due to severe pneumonia with H1N1 infection.

It was announced that on 11 September, the death of the 19-year-old man brought the total number of death cases to 74. The patient was brought to Gerik Hospital after flu symptoms persisted for 4 days. On 20 August, he was transferred to Ipoh Hospital where he was administered Tamiflu. Despite given antiviral drugs, he died on 23 August due to Acute Pulmonary Oedema with Underlying Influenza A(H1N1) infection.

Another two death cases were confirmed on 15 September, bringing the total number of cases to 76 in total. The first death, a 45-year-old woman who had hypertension was referred to Tambunan Hospital on 17 August after flu symptoms persisted. She was then sent to Keningau Hospital and antiviral was administered. After 10 days in ICU, she died due to severe bronchopneumonia and Acute respiratory distress syndrome. The second death registered was a 19-year-old teenage girl. She was sent to Kuala Lumpur Hospital and antiviral was administered. Despite given antiviral drugs, she died on 31 August due to severe pneumonia with H1N1 infection.

Terminology 
The flu virus is officially designated by the WHO as "Influenza A (H1N1)", following a name change from "swine flu" to avoid suggestions that eating pork products carried a risk of infection, and is referred as such by Malaysia's Health Minister. However, Information Communication and Culture Minister Rais Yatim suggested on 25 June that the local media use "swine flu" instead, justifying that the dangers of the flu would be better understood by the public, and that the flu would be easily described in Malay, a language which is officially used in news programmers of government-owned television and radio channels.

See also 
 2009 flu pandemic by country
 2009 flu pandemic timeline
 COVID-19 pandemic in Malaysia

Notes

External links 
Ministry of Health, Malaysia
 Official A(H1N1) Portal 

Malaysia
Flu Pandemic in Malaysia, 2009
Health disasters in Malaysia
2009 disasters in Malaysia